S.C. Dey College, Kalinagar, established in 1992, is a major and general degree college situated in Kalinagar, Hailakandi district, Assam. This college is affiliated with the Assam University.

Departments

Arts
Bengali
English
History
Economics
Political Science

References

External links

Universities and colleges in Assam
Colleges affiliated to Assam University
Educational institutions established in 1992
1992 establishments in Assam